England is divided by a number of different regional schemes for various purposes. Since the creation of the Government Office Regions in 1994 and their adoption for statistical purposes in 1999, some historical regional schemes have become obsolete. However, many alternative regional designations also exist and continue to be widely used.

Alternative

Cultural
Informal and overlapping regional designations are often used to describe areas of England. They include:
Midlands, often considered interchangeable with Mercia

Welsh Marches
Staffordshire Potteries
Three Counties
Northern England
Scottish Marches
Southern England
Home Counties
M4 corridor
Thames Valley
 Cinque Ports
West Country, often considered interchangeable with Wessex

Heptarchy
Heptarchy, former kingdom names which did not become counties have continued to be recognised by organisations as regions:
 , generally interchangeable the West Country excluding Cornwall
 
, often considered interchangeable with the Midlands
 , associated mainly with the Viking age rump kingdom of Northumbria (the counties of Durham and Northumberland) however can be considered interchangeable with Northern England

Counties 
Historic counties and the Yorkshire Ridings are no longer used as units for administrative or ceremonial purposes. These have continued to be recognised in sport and used by organisations as regional units.

 (historic)

National parks
National parks include:
Peak District
Lake District
Dartmoor
 Exmoor
North York Moors
Northumberland National Park
The Broads
New Forest
Yorkshire Dales
South Downs

Britain in Bloom regions
Britain in Bloom divides England into 12 regions. Mixture of government regions with some altered names. It also includes Cumbria, Thames-and-Chilterns (Berkshire, Buckinghamshire and Oxfordshire) and part of south east and south west as South-and-South-West.

National Trust
The National Trust has 10 regional offices in England.  These are
Devon and Cornwall – part of the official South West region
East of England – as region
East Midlands – as region
North East England – North East England and Yorkshire and the Humber
North West England – as region
Thames and Solent – Berkshire, Buckinghamshire, London, Oxfordshire, Hampshire
South East England – East Sussex, Kent, Surrey, West Sussex
West Midlands – as region
Wessex – South West England without Devon and Cornwall

Historical

500–1066

After the end of the Roman occupation of Britain, the area now known as England became divided into seven Anglo-Saxon kingdoms: Northumbria, Mercia, East Anglia, Essex, Kent, Sussex and Wessex. A number of other smaller political divisions and sub-kingdoms existed. The kingdoms were eventually united into the Kingdom of England in a process beginning with Egbert of Wessex in 829 and completed by King Edred in 954.

1655–1657

During  The Protectorate, Oliver Cromwell experimented with the Rule of the Major-Generals. There were ten regional associations covering England and Wales administered by majors-general. Ireland under Major-General Henry Cromwell, and Scotland under Major-General George Monck were in administrations already agreed upon and were not part of the scheme.

World War II
{|
| In the Second World War, England was divided into ten civil defence regions:
Northern: Durham, Northumberland, Yorkshire, North Riding
North Eastern: Yorkshire, East and West Riding
North Midland: Derbyshire, Leicestershire, Lincolnshire, Northamptonshire, Nottinghamshire, Rutland
Eastern: Bedfordshire, Cambridgeshire, Essex, Hertfordshire, Huntingdonshire, Norfolk, Suffolk
London: larger area than County of London/Middlesex, possibly same as Metropolitan Police District
Southern: Berkshire, Buckinghamshire, Dorset, Hampshire, Oxfordshire
South Western: Cornwall, Devon, Gloucestershire, Somerset, Wiltshire
Midland: Herefordshire, Shropshire, Staffordshire, Warwickshire, Worcestershire
North Western: Cheshire, Cumberland, Lancashire and Westmorland
South Eastern: Kent, Surrey and Sussex
|}

1945–1994

Economic planning regions
Eight economic planning regions were named by the Secretary of State for Economic Affairs, George Brown in December 1964.  These were:

 Northern – Cumberland, Durham, North Riding of Yorkshire, Northumberland, Westmorland
 North-West – Cheshire, Lancashire, High Peak area of Derbyshire
 Yorkshire and Humberside – East Riding of Yorkshire, West Riding of Yorkshire – Lincolnshire, Parts of Lindsey
 East Midlands – Derbyshire (minus High Peak), Leicestershire, Lincolnshire, Parts of Holland, Lincolnshire, Parts of Kesteven, Northamptonshire, Nottinghamshire, Rutland
 West Midlands – Herefordshire, Shropshire, Staffordshire, Warwickshire, Worcestershire
 South West – Cornwall, Devon, Dorset, Gloucestershire, Somerset, Wiltshire
 South East – Bedfordshire, Berkshire, Buckinghamshire, Essex, Greater London, Hampshire, Kent, Oxfordshire, Hertfordshire, Surrey, Sussex
 East Anglia – Norfolk, Suffolk, Cambridgeshire and Isle of Ely, Huntingdon and Peterborough

Standard statistical regions
Before the adoption of the government office regions for statistics, there were eight 'standard statistical regions':

 North – current North East plus Cumbria
 North West – current North West less Cumbria
 Yorkshire and Humberside – as current Yorkshire and The Humber
 West Midlands – as now
 East Midlands – as now
 East Anglia – Norfolk, Suffolk, and Cambridgeshire
 South West – as now
 South East – as now, plus Greater London, Bedfordshire, Essex, and Hertfordshire

Civil defence regions
The present government office regions closely resemble Civil Defence Regions.  During the latter part of the Cold War, the United Kingdom was divided into 11 such regions, most of which were divided themselves into sub-regions.  The regions were numbered as shown in the list, numbers for sub-regions were of the form 11.

The regions were based on pre-Second World War regions, but were substantially altered in the 1970s, with the merger of South East and Southern regions, and alterations in the north.  They were again altered in 1984, to merge the English regions 1 and 2 to become a single North East region, and Scotland's two southern regions (East and West Zones) becoming a single South Zone.

1980s
From the mid-1980s, the eight English Civil Defence Regions were as follows (using 1974/1975 boundaries):

North East England
(North East England) – Cleveland/Durham/Northumberland/Tyne and Wear
(Yorkshire and the Humber) – Humberside/North Yorkshire/South Yorkshire/West Yorkshire
East Midlands
Derbyshire/Lincolnshire/Nottinghamshire
Leicestershire/Northamptonshire
East of England
(East Anglia) – Cambridgeshire/Norfolk/Suffolk
Bedfordshire/Essex/Hertfordshire
Greater London – see Civil defence centres in London for sub-regions
South East England
East Sussex/Kent/Surrey/West Sussex
Berkshire/Buckinghamshire/Hampshire/Isle of Wight/Oxfordshire
South West England
Avon/Dorset/Gloucestershire/Somerset/Wiltshire
Cornwall/Devon
West Midlands
Staffordshire/Warwickshire/West Midlands
Hereford and Worcester/Shropshire
North West England
Cumbria/Lancashire
Cheshire/Greater Manchester/Merseyside

Redcliffe-Maud provinces

The Redcliffe-Maud Report produced by the Royal Commission on local government reform in 1969 recommended the creation of eight provinces.  In approximate terms, these were to be:

 North East – per North East England
 Yorkshire – per Yorkshire and the Humber
 North West – per North West England, excluding southern Cheshire
 West Midlands – per West Midlands, including southern Cheshire
 East Midlands – per East Midlands, less Northamptonshire and mid Lincolnshire
 South West – per South West England
 East Anglia – Cambridgeshire, Norfolk, Suffolk, northern Essex, southern Lincolnshire
 South East – South East England and Greater London with Northamptonshire, Hertfordshire, Bedfordshire, southern Essex

See also
List of ITV regions
BBC English Regions
International Territorial Level
Nomenclature of Territorial Units for Statistics
The United States of Europe, A Eurotopia?

References

.
.
Types of subdivision in the United Kingdom